Ninux.org is a wireless community network in Italy, a free, open and experimental computer network. The main idea is that users build their own computer network without central control or property, as opposed to traditional Internet service providers (ISP), where a single entity owns and manages the network. The initiative is based on the Ninux manifesto, the Wireless Commons Manifesto and the Picopeering Agreement. In these agreements participants agree upon a network that is free from discrimination, in the sense of net neutrality.

With 352 active nodes and 2216 planned nodes, it is one of the top ten wireless community networks in the world in number of active nodes. Ninux is part of the international movement for open wireless radio networks. For more information on such projects around the world, see wireless community network.

Since 2013, Ninux is an experimental member of the NaMeX Internet Exchange Point in Rome.

History 
It was born in Rome around 2002 and now spanning all over Italy. Its name currently stands for "Neighborhood Internet, Network Under eXperiment". In fact, Ninux.org has been testing devices, auto-built antennas and routing protocols while exchanging knowledge with the other Community Networks in Europe.

Ninux has participated since its early editions in the organization of the Battlemesh. Member since 2014 of the Community-Lab.net testbed.

References

External links 
 An analysis of the Ninux wireless community network, L. Maccari, IEEE 9th International Conference on Wireless and Mobile Computing, Networking and Communications (WiMob), 2013.
Detecting Incidents in Wireless Mesh Networks using Flow and Routing Information, Lothar Braun, Alexander Klein, Leon Aaron Kaplan, Georg Carle, COMPUTER SCIENCE 2011 Conference, TU-Berlin, 2011.
Analysis of commons based organisations and a collaborative environment for the "Bottom-up Broadband" initiative in Europe, Adriana Marti Hoppmann, Llorenç Cerdà Alabern, Llorenç (Catalan).
An interview with Freifunk and Ninux in the International Summit of Wireless Community Networks in Berlin, 2013
A reference in free open networks and one of the first organisations in Italy to implement IPv6
Wireless Networking in the developing world. A practical guide to planning and building low-cost telecommunications infrastructure, 3rd edition, Feb. 2013 
Ninux is part of the CONFINE FP7 FIRE Integrated Project for research in community networks
draft-funkfeuer-manet-olsrv2-etx-00 Packet Sequence Number based ETX Metric for Mobile Ad Hoc Networks, 2010.

Internet service providers
Community networks
Wireless network organizations